The 2019 season was Malmö FF's 108th in existence, their 84th season in Allsvenskan and their 19th consecutive season in the league. They competed in Allsvenskan where they finished as runners-up, the 2018–19 Svenska Cupen where they were knocked out in the group stage, and the 2018–19 UEFA Europa League where they were knocked out in the round of 32. Malmö FF also participated in two competitions in which the club continued playing in for the 2020 season, the 2019–20 Svenska Cupen and the 2019–20 UEFA Europa League. The season began with the first leg of the round of 32 of the UEFA Europa League on 14 February, league play started on 1 April and concluded on 2 November. The season concluded with the last UEFA Europa League group stage match on 12 December.

Malmö FF managed to qualify for a second consecutive group stage in the UEFA Europa League after having successfully gone through the qualification stage from the first round. For the first time in the club's history, they finished at the top of a European group after having beaten regional rival F.C. Copenhagen on the final match day. On the domestic stage, the club narrowly lost the league title to Djurgårdens IF, finishing one point behind in the league table. In Svenska Cupen, Malmö FF didn't make it across the group stage, having lost against Superettan club Östers IF.

Players

Squad

Players in/out

In

Out

Player statistics

Appearances and goals

Competitions

Allsvenskan

League table

Results summary

Results by round

Matches

Svenska Cupen
Kickoff times are in UTC+1 unless stated otherwise.

2018–19
The tournament continued from the 2018 season.

Group stage

2019–20
The tournament continued into the 2020 season.

Qualification stage

UEFA Europa League

Kickoff times are in UTC+1 unless stated otherwise.

2018–19
The tournament continued from the 2018 season.

Knockout phase

Round of 32

2019–20
The tournament continued into the 2020 season.

Qualifying phase and play-off round

First qualifying round

Second qualifying round

Third qualifying round

Play-off round

Group stage

Times up to 27 October 2019 (matchdays 1–3) are CEST (UTC+2), thereafter (matchdays 4–6) times are CET (UTC+1).

Non-competitive

Pre-season
Kickoff times are in UTC+1 unless stated otherwise.

Malmö FF were initially scheduled to return to Bradenton, Florida for pre-season camp. However, after advancing to a Europa League round of 32 match-up with Chelsea to be played in the midst of pre-season, the club rescheduled camp to Marbella to reduce travel.

Mid-season
Kickoff times are in UTC+2 unless stated otherwise.

Post-season
Kickoff times are in UTC+1 unless stated otherwise.

Footnotes

External links

  

Malmö FF
Malmö FF seasons
Malmo